The 2000 Oklahoma Sooners softball team was an American college softball team that represented the University of Oklahoma during the 2000 NCAA Division I softball season. The Sooners were led by Patty Gasso in her sixth season, and played their home games at OU Softball Complex. They competed in the Big 12 Conference, where they finished the season with a 66–8 record, including 17–1 in conference play.

The Sooners were invited to the 2000 NCAA Division I softball tournament, where they swept the West Regional and then completed a run through the Women's College World Series in their first appearance to claim the NCAA Women's College World Series Championship.

Roster

Schedule

Rankings

References

Oklahoma
Oklahoma Sooners softball seasons
Oklahoma Softball
Women's College World Series seasons
NCAA Division I softball tournament seasons
Big 12 Conference softball champion seasons